Albert "Bert" van Vlaanderen (born 25 November 1964 in Tienhoven, Stichtse Vecht) is a retired long-distance runner from the Netherlands

Biography
Van Vlaanderen participated in two Summer Olympics. At the 1992 Olympic Marathon in Barcelona he finished in fifteenth position with a time of 2 hours, 15 minutes and 47 seconds. Four years later in Atlanta, Georgia Van Vlaanderen ended the marathon in 45th place, clocking 2:20.48. His best performance was the bronze medal at the 1993 World Championships in Stuttgart.

Achievements
All results regarding marathon, unless stated otherwise

References
  Dutch Olympic Committee

1964 births
Living people
Athletes (track and field) at the 1992 Summer Olympics
Athletes (track and field) at the 1996 Summer Olympics
Dutch male long-distance runners
Dutch male marathon runners
Olympic athletes of the Netherlands
People from Vianen
World Athletics Championships medalists
Sportspeople from Utrecht (province)